Chinthaka Perera (born 14 February 1985) is a Sri Lankan cricketer. He played 54 first-class and 40 List A matches for multiple domestic sides in Sri Lanka between 2001 and 2013. His last first-class match was for Colombo Cricket Club in the 2012–13 Premier Trophy on 15 March 2013.

See also
 List of Chilaw Marians Cricket Club players

References

External links
 

1985 births
Living people
Sri Lankan cricketers
Basnahira North cricketers
Basnahira South cricketers
Chilaw Marians Cricket Club cricketers
Ruhuna cricketers
Sinhalese Sports Club cricketers
Place of birth missing (living people)